The College of Science is a college within the University of Notre Dame. The Dean of the College of Science is Santiago Schnell, appointed Sept 1st, 2021.

History
The College of Science was established in 1865 by Rev. John Zahm, C.S.C., and in 1884 the first Science Hall is built (now LaFortune Student Center).

In April 1899 Professor Jerome Green his assistants set out to replicate the wireless experiments conducted by Guglielmo Marconi. First they sent messages between different rooms of Science Hall (now LaFortune Hall), then they tried between Science Hall and Sorin Hall, and finally they successfully transmitted messages from the spire of the Sacred Heart Church to Saint Mary's College, several miles away. He then went on to replicate these experiments the following month in Chicago. Although these experiments were merely duplication of those of Marconi, they were the first radio transmissions in America.

Rev. Julius Nieuwland, C.S.C., a Notre Dame chemist and botanist, establishes 1909 The American Midland Naturalist, a Midwestern plant life quarterly that today is an international journal of ecology, evolution, and the environment. His research leads to the development in 1930 at DuPont industries of Neoprene, the first synthetic rubber. Because of his contribution, in 1952 DuPont paid in part the construction of Nieuwland Science Hall, that to this day hosts research in physics and chemistry. The Laboratories of Bacteriology at the University of Notre Dame (LOBUND) is established in 1935 after the germ-free research of Prof. James Reyniers. The LOBUND attracts top scientists and became the world's leader institution in germ-free research.

The first whole-ecosystem experiment is performed in 1951 on about 7,500 acres on the Wisconsin-Michigan border at the University of Notre Dame Environmental Research Center (UNDERC), land owned by the university comprising several lakes and used for environmental research.

Prof. George B. Craig Jr. becomes the director of the Vector Biology Laboratory in 1957 and, for the next two decades, performs important research into the genetics of Aedes aegypti. The New York Times called Craig "one of the world's foremost experts on mosquitoes". and the National Academies Press called him "an internationally recognized expert on the biology and control of mosquitoes" and that his "contributions made ... to medical entomology are almost incalculable".
The Jordan Hall of Science opens in 2006, after an investment of more than $70 million donated by Chicago business man Jay Jordan. The Hall includes a Digital Visualization Theater, 40 teaching labs, two lecture halls, an observatory, a greenhouse, and a space exhibiting the extensive plant collection of Rev. Nieuwland. In 2005 Notre Dame is part of a consortium that sponsored the Large Binocular Telescope. In 1989 Dr. Malcolm Fraser discovered and developed the PiggyBac transposon system.

Departments, Majors, and Minors
Department of Applied and Computational Mathematics and Statistics
Applied and Computational Mathematics and Statistics (ACMS) (major) 
Statistics (major)
Department of Biological Sciences
Biological Sciences (major)
Environmental Sciences (major)
Department of Chemistry and Biochemistry
Chemistry (major)
Biochemistry (major)
Department of Mathematics
Mathematics (major)
Actuarial Science (minor)
Department of Physics
Physics (major)
Collegiate Sequence
Science-Business (major)
Science-Computing (major)
Science-Education (major)
Neuroscience and Behavior (major)
Preprofessional Studies (major)
Energy Studies (minor)
Sustainability (minor)

Facilities
The College of Science has facilities in Jordan Hall, Galvin Hall, Stepan Chemistry Hall, Nieuwland Hall, McCourtney, and other locations on campus. UNDERC is a center for environmental studies located on the Wisconsin-Michigan border.

List of deans
 Rev. Julius Nieuwland (1921-1923)
 Rev. Francis J. Wenninger (1923-1940)
 Henry B. Froning (1940-1943)
 Lawrence H. Baldinger (1943-1960)
 Frederick D. Rossini (1960-1967)
 Bernard Waldman (1967-1979)
 Francis J. Castellino (1979-2002)
 Joseph P. Marino (2002-2008)
 Gregory Crawford (2008-2015)
 Mary Galvin (2015-2021)
 Santiago Schnell (2021-)

Notable faculty
John Zahm
Julius Nieuwland
George B. Craig
Paul Erdős
Don Lincoln
Emil Artin
Albert-László Barabási
Eugene Guth
Ernest L. Eliel
Karl Menger
Kurt Gödel

Notable alumni
Eric Wieschaus Nobel Prize for Medicine in 1995
Tom Dooley
Charles W. Misner
Carol Shields
Francis Versnyder, William D. Manly, and Bob Galvin, recipients of the National Medal of Technology and Innovation

References

External links

College Of engineering
Engineering universities and colleges in Indiana
1865 establishments in Indiana